is a Finnish television series based on the format of the BBC Antiques Roadshow. It first aired on Finnish TV in 1997.

See also
 List of Finnish television series

References

External links
 

Finnish television shows
1997 Finnish television series debuts
2006 Finnish television series endings
1990s Finnish television series
2000s Finnish television series

Yle original programming